is a Japanese surname. Notable people with the surname include:

, Japanese animator
, Japanese musician and composer
, Japanese swordsman
, Japanese footballer
, Japanese composer and record producer
, Japanese actor
, Japanese footballer
, Japanese cellist
, Japanese businessman and politician
, Japanese businessman
, Japanese television and film director

Tsutsumi (written: 坊) is also a masculine Japanese given name. Notable people with the name include:

, Japanese ice hockey player

See also
Toyota Tsutsumi plant

Japanese-language surnames
Japanese masculine given names